The AASHTO Soil Classification System was developed by the American Association of State Highway and Transportation Officials, and is used as a guide for the classification of soils and soil-aggregate mixtures for highway construction purposes. The classification system was first developed by Hogentogler and Terzaghi in 1929, but has been revised several times since.

Plasticity index of A-7-5 subgroup is equal to or less than the LL - 30.  Plasticity index of A-7-6 subgroup is greater than LL - 30.

References

See also 
 Unified Soil Classification System

Soil classification